William J. S. May (April 6, 1902 – June 1, 1989) was an American politician in the state of Washington. He served in the Washington House of Representatives from 1961 to 1981.

References

External links 
 William J.S. May at ourcampaigns.com

1989 deaths
1902 births
Democratic Party members of the Washington House of Representatives
20th-century American politicians